Dmitri Nikolaievich Korobov (born 12 March 1989), is a Belarusian professional ice hockey defenceman. He is currently contracted with HC Dinamo Minsk of the Kontinental Hockey League (KHL).

Playing career
After coming up through the ranks with his native Gomel and later HC Dinamo Minsk Korobov was signed to a two-year entry-level deal with the Tampa Bay Lightning on 2 August 2012. In the final year of his contract with the Lightning, Korobov was recalled from American Hockey League affiliate, the Syracuse Crunch, and made his NHL debut, featuring in 3 games in the 2013–14 season.

On 1 July 2014, Korobov opted to return to the KHL as a free agent, signing a two-year contract with Atlant Moscow Oblast.

After playing a further two seasons with Dinamo Minsk, Korobov left the club for the third time in his career, agreeing to a two-year deal with Russian club, Torpedo Nizhny Novgorod beginning from the 2018–19 season, on July 14, 2018.

Korobov left Torpedo after just one season, opting to continue his career in the KHL with Amur Khabarovsk for the 2019–20 season on 4 August 2019. Korobov played in 29 regular season games with Amur, collecting just 2 goals, before he was hampered by injury.

As a free agent, Korobov continued his tenure in the KHL, agreeing to a one-year contract with Salavat Yulaev Ufa on 2 May 2020.

International play
He has represented Belarus at the 2009 and 2011 IIHF World Championships.

Career statistics

Regular season and playoffs

International

References

External links

1989 births
Living people
Amur Khabarovsk players
Atlant Moscow Oblast players
Belarusian ice hockey defencemen
HC Dinamo Minsk players
HK Gomel players
Keramin Minsk players
People from Navapolatsk
Salavat Yulaev Ufa players
HC Shakhtyor Soligorsk players
HC Spartak Moscow players
Syracuse Crunch players
Tampa Bay Lightning players
Torpedo Nizhny Novgorod players
Undrafted National Hockey League players
Sportspeople from Vitebsk Region